The 2001 Hofstra Pride football team represented Hofstra University during the 2001 NCAA Division I-AA football season. It was the program's 61st season and they finished in a four-way tie as Atlantic 10 Conference (A-10) co-champions with Maine, Villanova, and William & Mary. Each team finished with identical 7–2 conference records. The Pride earned a berth into the 16-team Division I-AA playoffs, but lost in the opening round to Lehigh, 24–27, in overtime. Hofstra was led by 12th-year head coach Joe Gardi and their captain was Charlie Adams.

Redshirt senior quarterback Rocky Butler finished as a finalist for the Walter Payton Award, which is given annually to the most outstanding offensive player in Division I-AA (now known as Football Championship Subdivision), as chosen by a nationwide panel of media and college sports information directors.

Schedule

Awards and honors
First Team All-America – Rocky Butler (Walter Camp, The Sports Network, Associated Press); Dan Zorger (Walter Camp, The Sports Network); Ryan Fletcher (Walter Camp, The Sports Network); Kahmal Roy (Walter Camp, Associated Press)
Second Team All-America – Rocky Butler (The Football Gazette); Dan Zorger (Associated Press); Ryan Fletcher (Associated Press); Kahmal Roy (The Sports Network, The Football Gazette)
Third Team All-America – Dan Zorger (The Football Gazette); Doug Shanahan (The Sports Network, Associated Press)
Honorable Mention All-America – Ryan Fletcher (The Football Gazette); Doug Shanahan (The Football Gazette); Michael Brigandi (The Football Gazette)
First Team All-Atlantic 10 – Rocky Butler, Dan Zorger, Kahmal Roy, Michael Brigandi, Ryan Fletcher, Doug Shanahan
Second Team All-Atlantic 10 – Charlie Adams, Rich Holzer, Todd DeLamielleure
Third Team All-Atlantic 10 – Trevor Dimmie
First Team All-ECAC – Rocky Butler, Dan Zorger, Kahmal Roy

References

Hofstra
Hofstra Pride football seasons
Atlantic 10 Conference football champion seasons
Hofstra Pride football